This is a list of the 18 observers to the European Parliament for East Germany in the 1989–1994 session. They were appointed by the German Bundestag as observers from 21 February 1991 during German reunification.

List

See also 

 Members of the European Parliament
 List of members of the European Parliament, 1989–1994

References 

1991–1994
List
East Germany
East German politicians